The Archaeological Museum of Rethymno is a museum in Rethymno, Crete, Greece.

The building that houses the museum is the church of San Francesco, built by the Barozzi family around 1530.

External links
Municipality of Rethymno
 Ministry of Culture and Sports (odysseus.culture.gr), Archaeological Museum of Rethymno
 The whole history of Crete in the church of Agios Francis

Rethymno
Rethymno